Hatton Castle stands on the lower part of Hatton Hill, the most easterly of the Sidlaw Hills, to the south of Newtyle in Angus, Scotland.  The castle overlooks the wooded Den of Newtyle, and its views extend across Strathmore and include Ben Lawers and Schiehallion as well as the Angus and Glenshee hills. The 16th-century castle was originally built in a typical Scottish "Z plan" tower house design, as a fortified country house or château.  There was an earlier castle called Balcraig Castle which stood less than half a mile from the present building, also on Hatton Hill.

Etymology
The name "Hatton" was adopted from the farm nearby.  "Hatton" is a contraction of Hall-toun, which in Scots means the farm (or ferm toun) near the Hall (or Ha).  Thus the Hall must have been there first, and the name "Hatton" actually refers to the adjacent farm, now known as Hatton Farm (the word farm is thus redundant, duplicating toun). Hatton Castle was probably originally called "Newtyle Castle", taking its name from the estate.  In Scots, the word tyle means a roofing stone (not restricted to fired clay tiles as in English).  There are brick and tile factories on the River Tay near Dundee, but "Newtyle" most likely relates to the sandstone quarried locally, and used extensively for building, dyking and roofing, as well as for carving into Pictish standing stones such as those preserved at the nearby Meigle Sculptured Stone Museum.  The name Newtyle rather implies that there was another place where sandstone was quarried previously.

History
The earliest history of the general area demonstrates that Pictish peoples inhabited the area. For example, discovery of the Eassie Stone in this region indicates sophisticated Pictish carvers who embraced Christianity about the year 600 AD.

The lands were given to Sir William Olifard (8th chief) in 1317 by Robert the Bruce. Robert the Bruce's daughter, Elizabeth, married Sir William Olifard's great nephew, Sir Walter Olifaunt, on whom the Newtyle estate was reconfirmed by her brother, David II by a charter dated 1364. The castle was built in 1575, commissioned by Laurence, fourth Lord Oliphant (1527–1593). Hatton Castle is unusual in that it contains a scale and platt staircase incorporated into its original construction. Such a feature was normally only included in larger constructions.  The 4th Lord Oliphant also considerably extended another of his many castles, Kellie Castle in Fife, which bears many similarities.

A variety of people lived in Hatton Castle after the Oliphants, including at least one bishop.  It is recorded by Marian McNeill, quoting A. Hislop, Book of Scottish Anecdote, that the old Scots custom of 'enforced hospitality', to extract information from travellers, was demonstrated at Hatton Castle:  "The Lords Oliphant used to keep a cannon pointed to the road near by their old castle, so as to compel the wayfarers to come in and be regaled".  A cannon is still there today. Hatton was the home of the Masters of Oliphant rather than their fathers, who resided primarily at Aberdalgie and Dupplin Castles.

Hatton Castle was de-roofed in about 1720, after the 1715 Jacobite rising, when it was replaced by the Italian-style Belmont Castle in Meigle, which is now a Church of Scotland residential home.  Hatton Castle gradually became encrusted by ivy and a home to pigeons and jackdaws, until it was sold by the Kinpurnie Estate for reconstruction.  This has been done faithfully, initially by Roderick Oliphant of Oliphant, yr and his elder brother Richard Oliphant of that Ilk (34th chief), so its charm remains much as it was in 1575, including glass hand-made in Edinburgh, in the leaded windows. Under-floor heating was installed (during the reconstruction) to avoid the sight of radiators. The exterior is harled with the traditional pinkish lime-based hand-daub.

Hatton Castle is now a family home, and the present owners have continued the restoration, aided by specialist castle-restorer Gordon Matthew of Midmar. It still has the strong room which, in ancient times, would have served as a bank for valuables for local people – one of the functions of a Hall.  There is a 'priest hole' in what was originally the laird's bedroom.  Not so much for priests, one suspects, as for young ladies who might have needed a secret exit route.  Hatton Castle has an interesting Great Hall, almost a double-cube measuring 34×17×17 feet, which has stunning acoustics.  As in the 16th century, music is again played most days in the Great Hall, and some memorable dances and house-concerts have been held. It is a regular gathering place for Scottish traditional musicians, notably hosting the creative network, 'Fiddle Force'.  House Concerts are held, on a non-commercial basis, for a wide variety of artists, memorably including, for example, The Poozies, Barbaby Brown and John Kenny (Sardinian triple pipes and carnyx), Park Stickney (jazz harp), Philip Higham (Bach cello suites and more), Cathy Fraser from Australia, Fiddlelore from New Zealand, Douglas Lawrence, Gregor Borland and Sandy Brechin, Jarlath Henderson, Man's Ruin a variety of line-ups involving Ewan McPherson, Eskil Romme with his Danish band Himmerland, and The Chaps, from Dunedin. Anne-Marie Forsyth, from Auckland, has held annual international Scots Fiddle tuition courses, tutored by Gregor Borland, Dougie Lawrence, Patsy Reid and others. In 2007, Hatton Castle hosted the first-ever performance in Europe of a Japanese biwa and chant group, supported by the Scottish harp duo Sileas. American cellist Abby Newton, with David Greenberg, Corrina Kewat, Mairi Campbell, Dave Francis and Scott Petito in her group Ferintosh, recorded her Scottish Traditional album Castles, Kirks and Caves in the Great Hall. In the gardens, the pedal-powered HandleBards have regularly performed Shakespeare's plays.

Gardens
No record exists of the original gardens of Hatton Castle, but a house of this scale would certainly have had fine gardens in the 16th and 17th centuries.  The buildings of Hatton Farm probably stand on what was originally a garden to the south of Hatton Castle. Until the 1990s when the current owner took it on, Hatton Castle stood in a gently sloping field full of sheep, cattle and a gaggle of geese from the adjacent curling pond.  Sir James Cayzer, from the neighbouring Kinpurnie Estate planted standard trees in the surrounding parkland, and a garden is now emerging for Hatton Castle, featuring dry-stane dyking up to three metres high.  This is the work of master-dyker Duncan Armstrong.  An orchard of ancient Scottish apple varieties has been planted, as well as mulberry trees, and the sunken vegetable garden contains fig trees and artichokes. The eastern boundary of the garden of Hatton Castle is the Dundee and Newtyle Railway, which was the first railway line to open in the north of Scotland. It was built to transport daffodil and other flowers grown in farms around Newtyle to Dundee, and thence by ship to Edinburgh.  The 'bulb factory' was adjacent to Newtyle station, which still exists.

See also
Glamis Castle

References

Castles in Angus, Scotland
Category B listed buildings in Angus, Scotland
Listed castles in Scotland